Armando Calderón Sol (24 June 1949 – 9 October 2017) was President of El Salvador from 1 June 1994, to 1 June 1999, representing the Nationalist Republican Alliance. He was the first president elected in El Salvador after twelve years of civil war.

Early life and education
Born in San Salvador in 1949, Calderón attended the exclusive primary and secondary school Colegio Externado San José, graduating in 1966. In 1977, Calderón received a graduate degree in Jurisprudence and Social Sciences from Universidad Nacional de El Salvador. He was a lawyer, a businessman, and one of the founders of Nationalist Republican Alliance (ARENA), in September 1981.

Political career

Mayor of San Salvador
As Mayor of San Salvador from 1988 to 1994 he built the Monument to "Hermano Lejano" at the end of the Comalapa Highway and Blvd. Los Proceres and also built the bust monuments along the Proceres Boulevard. He promoted physical exercise and initiated a cyclist's circuit in the San Jacinto neighbourhood on Avenida Cuba.

President of El Salvador

When he ran for president in 1994 he won the presidential office during the runoff elections against the leftist candidate, Dr. Ruben Zamora from the CD-FMLN coalition.

Calderón is acknowledged in the press for restoring the status-quo after the civil war, which ended on 16 January 1992. He advocated the privatization of state owned telephone companies and pension funds to stimulate the economy and modernize the country's infrastructure. He is also known for having promoted reforms to make El Salvador competitive in the maquila industry, removing trade barriers across the board, including removing protection for local agriculture. This had the unintended consequence of disrupting small scale farming, driving migration to larger cities (and abroad, especially the U.S.) and creating a cheaper labour supply for the maquilas.

Calderón is also credited with the integration of former guerrillas combatants back into civilian life. He is also known for having initiated the privatization of the telecommunications company ANTEL and the electrical works company, CAESS (Compañía de Alumbrado Electrico de San Salvador), public hospitals and pension funds. He followed president Alfredo Cristiani's neoliberal approach, and his structural adjustment programs.

Death
Calderón Sol died on 9 October 2017 of lung cancer at a Houston, Texas, hospital at the age of 69.

References

External links
 https://web.archive.org/web/20030207070924/http://archive.laprensa.com.sv/19990703/
 Extended biography of Armando Calderón Sol at Fundación CIDOB

1949 births
2017 deaths
People from San Salvador
Presidents of El Salvador
Nationalist Republican Alliance politicians
Mayors of places in El Salvador
Mayors of San Salvador
Deaths from cancer in Texas
Deaths from lung cancer
Sol family
Grand Crosses with Diamonds of the Order of the Sun of Peru
Collars of the Order of Isabella the Catholic